Lower Historic District is a historic district on Washington Mountain Road in Washington, Massachusetts.  The district encompasses four homesteads built between 1765 and 1803, including the town's oldest house.  The houses are clustered along a stretch of Washington Mountain Road near the town line with Becket, and represent one of its first places of settlement.  The district was listed on the National Register of Historic Places in 1986.

Description and history
Land grants in the area that is now the town of Washington were first made in 1763.  One of the first ten grants was made to William Milliken, who built the house at 1796 Washington Mountain Road not long afterward. Between then and the early 19th century, Milliken was joined by three other settlers in the immediate area, which is set on a terrace on the southeastern slope of Washington Mountain (elevation ). This dispersed rural development was typical of the region in the period, but has in many instances been lost due to infill development.  In this area, the soil was never very good for agriculture, and the properties changed hands numerous times.  The area also lacked resources for industrial development, and was bypassed by the railroads, all of which were factors that effectively precluded later development.

The district extends along Washington Mountain Road, north from the town line with Becket.  Its principal surviving built resources are four houses, of which the Milliken house is the only one that predates American independence.  The other three were built in the late 18th or early 19th century, and are examples of vernacular Federal period architecture.  All are of wood-frame construction, with clapboarded exteriors; one is  stories in height, while the other three are  stories.  There is also a 19th-century barn associated with one of the houses.

See also

Upper Historic District (Washington, Massachusetts), which encompasses the old town center
National Register of Historic Places listings in Berkshire County, Massachusetts

References

Historic districts on the National Register of Historic Places in Massachusetts
National Register of Historic Places in Berkshire County, Massachusetts
Washington, Massachusetts